Donna T. McLeod (born March 19, 1968) is a Jamaican-born American politician from Georgia. McLeod is a member of the Georgia House of Representatives from the 105th District since 2019. She is the first Jamaican-American to become a Representative in Georgia. She defeated Republican Donna Sheldon in the 2018 election to replace retiring Representative Joyce Chandler.

Political career and achievements   
She served as the  Committee Chair for Voter Outreach and Outreach for the Gwinnett County Democratic Party and continues to be an active member of the Gwinnett Democrats.

Ms. McLeod was a grassroots organizer for Senator Obama’s 2008 campaign. In 2012, she was National Director for Voter Outreach for Black Women for Obama.

In 2016, she ran for State House Representative, District 105, in Gwinnett County, GA. Ms. McLeod was endorsed by President Barack Obama. She lost the race by 222 votes. Ms. McLeod ran again for State House Representative, District 105 in 2018. On November 6, 2018, she was elected State Representative for District 105, winning with over 4000 votes. In 2018, she also earned the endorsements of both President Barack Obama and Attorney General Eric Holder.

During the 2019 Legislative Session, Representative McLeod worked with the Department of Corrections and the Department of Community Services to update their release documents to ensure that Ex-Felons that have served their time will be informed that their Voting Rights are restored.

Ms. McLeod is a co-founder of C.A.N.I, Inc., (Community Action Network Initiatives) a non-profit 501c3 organization that helps educate and inform people of their civic and societal rights and responsibilities.

Early life 
On March 19, 1968, McLeod was born in Kingston, Jamaica. She migrated to Canada in 1977, where she grew up. She moved to Georgia in 1998 and became a US citizen in 2012.

Education 
In 1989, McLeod earned a Bachelors degree in Chemical Engineering from Humber College.

Professional career 
Donna McLeod is a Chemical Engineer with over 30 years of experience in Quality Assurance Management/ Engineering, she is now the President/CEO of Enviroqual, LLC a Quality Assurance/Regulatory Consulting company specializing in Medical Devices, Food, Plastics, and Pharmaceuticals.

McLeod first ran to represent District 105 in the Georgia House of Representatives in 2016, but lost the general election to incumbent Joyce Chandler. In 2018, she ran again, and defeated Republican Donna Sheldon. In 2020 she ran for a third time and defeated Erik Dieks.

McLeod currently sits on the following committees:
 Code Revision
 Human Relations & Aging
 Interstate Cooperation
 Science and Technology

Electoral record 

In 2018, Mcleod was unopposed in the Democratic primary for the District 105 seat.

Awards 
She was awarded the Georgia Secretary of State Outstanding Citizen Award in 2015, RevUp’s Sankofa Leadership in 2017, Gwinnett County Democratic Party Leadership/Service Award in 2017, and Freedom Fighter Award from the Family in 2018. She also sits on the STEM Board at Discovery High School.</ref>

Gallery

References

External links

Campaign website

Living people
21st-century American women politicians
21st-century American politicians
Candidates in the 2022 United States House of Representatives elections
Democratic Party members of the Georgia House of Representatives
Women state legislators in Georgia (U.S. state)
1968 births
People from Lawrenceville, Georgia
Humber College alumni
American politicians of Jamaican descent
Jamaican emigrants to the United States
Politicians from Kingston, Jamaica